John Alexander Robinson (born July 25, 1935) is a former American football player and coach best known for his two stints as head coach of the University of Southern California (USC) football team (1976–1982, 1993–1997) and for his tenure as head coach of the NFL's Los Angeles Rams (1983–1991). Robinson's USC teams won four Rose Bowls and captured a share of the national championship in the 1978 season. Robinson is one of the few college football head coaches to have non-consecutive tenure at the same school. In 2009, he was elected to the College Football Hall of Fame.

Early life and playing career
Robinson was born in Chicago, moved to Provo, Utah at six, and then to Daly City, California at nine, where he attended Catholic parochial school with future Pro Football Hall of Famer John Madden, at Our Lady of Perpetual Help, graduating in 1950, and Junípero Serra High School graduating in 1954. He attended the University of Oregon, where he played Tight End on Oregon's 1958 Rose Bowl team.

Coaching career

Early career
Robinson began his coaching career at the University of Oregon, his alma mater, where he served as an assistant coach under Len Casanova and Jerry Frei from 1960 to 1971. He then served as USC's offensive coordinator from 1972 to 1974 under head coach John McKay, who had been an assistant coach at Oregon when Robinson played there. During this three-year stretch, the Trojans went 31-3-2, winning three Pac-8 Conference titles and appearing in three Rose Bowls (winning two of them) with a pair of national championships. Robinson then left USC to serve as the Oakland Raiders' running backs coach in 1975, rejoining Madden, who was by then Oakland's head coach. That season, the Raiders went 11-3 and reached the AFC Championship Game, where they lost 16-10 to the Pittsburgh Steelers. In 1976, when John McKay left USC to coach the Tampa Bay Buccaneers, Robinson was named to succeed him. Robinson would coach at USC from 1976 to 1982, during which he led the Trojans to three conference titles and five bowl games. He won the Rose Bowl in 1977, 1979, and 1980 and USC earned a national championship in 1979. Following the 1982 season, Robinson stepped down as head coach with a record of 67-14-2 over seven seasons.

Los Angeles Rams
Hired to replace Ray Malavasi prior to the 1983 NFL season, John Robinson is considered one of the more successful coaches in Rams history, leading the franchise to the playoffs in six of his first seven seasons and twice reaching the NFC Championship Game. Both of those contests ended in defeat against eventual Super Bowl champions, the 1985 Chicago Bears and the 1989 San Francisco 49ers. Robinson's tenure as Rams coach was made more difficult by the fact that the Rams played in the same division as the 49ers, the dominant team of the 1980s (the only time he won the NFC West title during his tenure was 1985). However, he had great success in importing his trademark running game after using the No. 2 overall pick in the 1983 NFL Draft to draft running back Eric Dickerson. In just over four seasons with the Rams, Dickerson ran for 7,245 yards and led the league in rushing three times, with his 1984 total of 2,105 yards still an NFL record going into 2022. After Dickerson was traded midway through the 1987 season, Robinson's Rams still had the league's rushing leader in Charles White, while Greg Bell continued Robinson's running tradition with back-to-back 1,000-yard seasons in 1988 and 1989. Additionally, Robinson introduced to the league a group of highly-respected assistant coaches, including Norv Turner, Hudson Houck, and Gil Haskell, all of whom would go on to have long and productive NFL coaching careers.

Following the Rams' 30-3 loss in the 1989 NFC Championship Game, the Rams franchise went into decline. After a 5-11 season in 1990 and a 3-13 mark in 1991, Robinson was fired by the Rams, though his 79 career victories remain the most in franchise history.

Later career
After spending several seasons in radio and television broadcasting, Robinson returned to the sidelines in 1993 with USC. In his second stint with the Trojans, the team won three straight bowl games, including the 1996 Rose Bowl. Though Robinson never finished with a losing season at USC, his mark of 37-21-2 (including a 1-11 mark against traditional rivals Notre Dame and UCLA) led to his dismissal following the 1997 season. Two years later, Robinson was hired to coach football at the University of Nevada, Las Vegas. Robinson won his first two ganes in 1999, the second win coming at Baylor where the Rebels won despite entering the game's final play down by three points and not possessing the ball; the Rebels finished 3–8 in Robinson's first year. The Rebels rebounded to win eight games in 2000, including a 31-14 victory over Arkansas in the Las Vegas Bowl, Robinson's only bowl appearance with the Running Rebels. In 2002, Robinson was chosen as the university's athletic director, but he stepped down from that position a year later to concentrate on the coaching position. In 2003, he was inducted into the Rose Bowl Hall of Fame. Despite being relieved of duty as athletic director, he resigned after going 2–9 in his final season in 2004.

In 2010, Robinson returned to coaching as defensive coordinator at San Marcos High School in San Marcos, California, having never before coached at the high school level. With Robinson's assistance, the Knights went 4-7 and reached the CIF-San Diego Section football playoffs.

In July 2019, Robinson joined the LSU football program as a senior consultant to head coach Ed Orgeron. He remained in that position through the 2021 season.

Outside of coaching
Robinson began a three decade long association with Sports USA Radio Network in 1998, and as of January 2018 serves as a color analyst for the network. He is a board member for the Lott IMPACT Trophy, which is named after Pro Football Hall of Fame defensive back Ronnie Lott, and is awarded annually to college football's Defensive IMPACT Player of the Year.

His son, David Robinson, is a defensive coordinator for the Fullerton College Hornets football program. He had played on Fullerton's 1983 national title team. David worked for his father as an assistant coach, working in six bowl games, most notably the 1995 Cotton Bowl and 1996 Rose Bowl.

Robinson currently resides in Encinitas, California.

Head coaching record

College

NFL

See also
 Legends Poll

References

External links
 

1935 births
Living people
American football ends
College football announcers
Los Angeles Rams head coaches
National Football League announcers
Oakland Raiders coaches
Oregon Ducks football coaches
Oregon Ducks football players
UNLV Rebels athletic directors
UNLV Rebels football coaches
USC Trojans football coaches
High school football coaches in California
College Football Hall of Fame inductees
Sportspeople from Chicago
Junípero Serra High School (San Mateo, California) alumni
People from Daly City, California
Coaches of American football from California
Players of American football from California
Sportspeople from the San Francisco Bay Area
Players of American football from Chicago